Edna McDuffie Manning (born 1942) was the first president of the Oklahoma School of Science and Mathematics. She also owns a ranch on which she raises limousin cattle. In 2007 she was inducted into the Oklahoma Educators Hall of Fame.

Education and career

In February 1986, Manning became superintendent of the school district in Shawnee, Oklahoma. Facing a $1.2 million deficit, she reorganized the district's elementary schools, converting the small neighborhood schools into grade centers, each housing a single grade. This reorganization aroused strong feelings among some of the parents in the district, and resulted in several threats.

In 1988 Manning was appointed president of the Oklahoma School of Science and Mathematics, opened to students in 1990. Manning aided in the building and development of the institution, supervising the selection of faculty and the development of the curriculum.

In 2006, the OSSM board of trustees voted to rename the OSSM classroom building, previously called the Lincoln School, the Manning Academic Center. In September 2007, Manning was inducted into the Oklahoma Educators Hall of Fame.

Manning retired from her position as president of OSSM in June 2012, and was succeeded by Dr. Frank Y.H. Wang.

References

http://newsok.com/oklahoma-school-of-science-and-mathematics-has-new-president/article/3727350
http://okcfriday.com/presidency-fulfills-wangs-dream-p7492-92.htm

External links
Oklahoma School of Science and Mathematics
Oklahoma Educators Hall of Fame

21st-century American women
American cattlewomen
American educators
Living people
Women academic administrators
Women presidents of organizations
1942 births